Megullia, surnamed Dotata ('richly dowered'), was an ancient Roman noblewoman.

Life
Megullia is one of the one hundred and six subjects of Giovanni Boccaccio’s On Famous Women (De mulieribus claris, 1362). She is famous (as Boccaccio says) "more through the lavishness of her ancestors than through the worthiness of any of her own deeds. For at that time it seemed such a marvellous thing to give 50,000 bronze coins as dowry to one's husband..."  Boccaccio used manuscripts of Valerius Maximus as his source, but they "disagree widely about the amount of money in Megullia's dowry". Valerius says in his Book 4 (4.10) that Gnaeus Cornelius Scipio Calvus wrote to the Senate from Spain asking to be replaced. He wanted to go home to build up a dowry for his daughter that just became of marrying age. The Senate wanted Scipio to stay in command, so they consulted with the bride to be and Scipio's family and agreed on an amount that would be acceptable for a dowry of a daughter of a person of such high rank. They raised a dowry for Scipio's daughter from the treasury of 40,000 asses. Valerius compares this sum of a family fortune to those raised for "Tuccia, daughter of Caeso Quinctius" (10,000 asses) and for Megullia, daughter of a consul (50,000 asses) - from which the name "Dotata" (dowried) came when she entered her husband's house with this large amount. It was added to make then the name of the woman with such a large dowry that of Megullia Dotata. Besides Scipio and Fabricius, the Senate raised dowries for the daughters of others they wished to keep in service if there were no family funds for a dowry, like in the case of Fabricius Luscinus.

Dotata
At the beginning of the Roman republic dowries were small. For example, the dowry given by the senate to the daughter of Scipio Africanus was only 35 pounds or 11,000 asses of brass. If the dowry was about five times this amount, 160 - 175 pounds (50,000 asses of brass), then it was considered a Great Fortune and Megullia was nicknamed Dotata.  The name dotata was synonymous with "dowry girl" and was the name given to the bride that had a dowry. This trend continued for a long time and if anything above a normal amount was given then the female giver was called a Megullia Dotata.

See also 
 Paraphernalia

Notes

References 
Roman law and dotata: Roman Marriage: Iusti Coniuges from the Time of Cicero to the Time of Ulpian By Susan Treggiari, pp 96–104, 209–211, 326–342, 541; 
Daily Life in Ancient Rome: The People and the City at the Height of the Empire By Jerome Carcopino describes the dowry and dotata on pages 97 – 100
 Valerius Maximus translated by Henry J. Walker Memorable Deeds and Sayings: One Thousand Tales from Ancient Rome 
Horace referred to the wealthy wife's enslavement of the husband as, dotata regit virum conjux - a dowered wife rules her husband (Od iii, 18).
The New Comedy of Greece and Rome By Richard L. Hunter, "dotata ('dowered wife')  pp 91, 92, 166; 
 Cicero writes of the importance of the dotata and Roman customs in ad Att. XIV.13, XV.20, Pro Caecina c4 & c25
 Saint Jerome speaks of the large dowry (megullia dotata) in his Letters 9, 13, 54, 79.

External links
Ancient weddings
Ancient Roman wedding practice as related to marriage in Ireland speaks of the dotata as the dowry and the ancient Roman customs.
The female model and the reality of Roman women under the Republic and the Empire by Francesca Cenerini of Università di Bologna, reference to time of the Second Punic War pertaining to uxor dotata (a woman who had a large dowry).

Women of the Roman Republic